Firaaq is a 2014 Pakistani family drama television serial. The serial is directed by Aabis Raza, written by Mustafa Afridi and produced by Momina Duraid. Uzma Gillani, Syed Mazhar Ali, Mohib Mirza, Sanam Saeed, Junaid Khan, Noor Hassan Rizvi, Hira Saleem and Cybil Chaudhry plays the lead roles. Set in America, it follows the life of a broken family lives in Panama City, Florida, and Paiman who struggles to live at her own wills despite of boundaries by her mother.

Plot
The plot revolves around story of a broken Pakistani American family settled in Florida, United States. The story is about Paimaan, Imroze, Rumi, Sarah, Shams, and Hareem. Paimaan and Shams are siblings. Their father had died when they were very young. Their mother whom they call "Maa Jee" marries another man, Haider. At 10 years old, Shams realizes this and leaves the home in anger. Years pass,  and Paimaan grows up into a mature, quiet, and depressed girl due to her mother's behavior. Her mother is strict and do not allow her to go anywhere as she thinks that the atmosphere of America will spoil her, but her stepfather is friendly with her, understands her problems, and advises her to move out. This makes her mother angry as she believes that he is poisoning her mind. On the other hand, Shams has married a Pakistani girl, Sarah. Sarah is an orphan and she and Shams love each other, but before they marry Shams puts a condition that he does not want a child. Sarah agrees, but after few years of marriage she begins to demand a baby from Shams. Then, she goes to Shams family and meets other. When Shams realises this, he takes Paimaan with him to his house.

Cast
 Uzma Gillani as Maa Jee 
 S. Mazhar Ali as Haider  
 Mohib Mirza as Imroze
 Sanam Saeed as Paiman  
 Junaid Khan as Shams  
 Noor Hassan Rizvi as Roomi  
 Hira Mani as hareem 
 Cybil Chaudhry as Sara  
 Dr. Ismail Zahij  
 Kenyon Bozeman 
 Malik Qayyum Anwar 
 Maik Rose  
 Sabrina Rose 
 Asleen Nelson   
 Faizan  
 Hania Ikram  
 Muzamil Salman Sheikh

Production

Background and development
The story was written by Mustafa Afridi. It was the second serial of Hum Television that shot in same place outside of country, as first being was  Vasl. It marked second appearance of Junaid Khan and Sanam Saeed together after Mata-e-Jaan Hai Tu, where he plays Sanam's abusive husband. Model turned actress, Cybil mark his debut in acting by this serial. Veteran actor Syed Mazhar Ali returns to TV after massive heart attack and Uzma Gillani also appears on Hum TV after long time.

Filming and promotion
The serial was shot mostly in Panama City, Florida, in the United States, with some portion also taking place in Pakistan. Production and shooting began between May and June. Principal photography started in mid-July and finished in mid-August, with other editing processes.

The first teaser trailer was released on 24 August 2014, and OST of the drama serial was released on 29 August 2014.

Broadcast
On 14 December 2014, Firaaq began to broadcast on Sundays at 8 pm – 10:20 pm (PST) instead of on Saturdays at 8 pm – 9:10 pm (PST). Its last episode aired on Sunday, 28 December 2014 at 8 pm.

Original soundtrack

The Theme song of Firaaq is its original soundtrack, written by Azal Band and Abis Raza the director of serial, and composed by Shebi. The music is a label of Momina Duraid Productions. The song is sung by Razab Ali.

Track listing

See also
 List of Pakistani actresses
 List of Pakistani actors
 List of Pakistani television serials

References

External links
Official website
 
 Official Website 
 
 Hum TV's official Youtube
 Firaaq at Dailymotion 
Other resources
 Firaaq on HUMNetwork

Hum TV original programming
Urdu-language television shows
Pakistani drama television series
2014 Pakistani television series debuts
2014 Pakistani television series endings